Dario Giani (born 8 May 1938) is an Italian rower. He competed in the men's eight event at the 1964 Summer Olympics.

References

External links
 

1938 births
Living people
Italian male rowers
Olympic rowers of Italy
Rowers at the 1964 Summer Olympics
Sportspeople from the Province of Arezzo